The 1916 United States presidential election in Florida took place on November 7, 1916. All contemporary 48 states were part of the 1916 United States presidential election. Florida voters chose six electors to the Electoral College, which selected the President and Vice President.

Despite a rare four-way contest, the state was won handily by the incumbent Democratic President Woodrow Wilson. He garnered 69.34% of the vote, winning against the Republican nominee Charles Evans Hughes by a margin of 51.24%. He also won against Socialist candidate Allan L. Benson and Prohibition candidate Frank Hanly.

Results

Results by county

Notes

References

Florida
1916
1916 Florida elections